Anisya Byasyrovna Kirdyapkina (née Kornikova ; born October 23, 1989) is a Russian race walker. She is married to Sergey Kirdyapkin, who is also a racewalker. She was discovered by the race walking coach Konstantin Nacharkin at the age of nine. She met her future husband through race walking and they were married when she was 18. As of 2014, they shared a coach, Viktor Chegin.

Career 
In 2007, she won the Russian Winter Championships, the European Race Walking Cup and the European Junior Championships, all 10 km races.  She race in the 20 km IAAF Race Walking Challenge Final, which was held in her hometown of Saransk.  She finished second to Olga Kaniskina.  She received two technique disqualifications in races in 2008.  In 2009, she finished in 4th at the World Championships which was retrospectively upgraded to bronze due to the disqualification of the original gold medalist, 5 days before her husband won gold.  In 2010, she won the summer and winter Russian titles, setting a new personal best of 1.25.11.  That year, she finished second in a Russian one, two, three at the European Championships.  At the 2011 she won a bronze medal at the World Championships.

Kirdyapkina's qualification for the 2012 Olympics came down to a battle between her and Tatyana Sibileva.  Kirdyapkina qualified for the 2012 Olympics by beating Sibileva at the Russian National Championships.  At the 2012 Olympics, she finished in 5th place.

At the 2013 Universiade, held in Kazan, Russia, Kirdyapkina lead a Russian one, two, three with a championship record of 1:29:30.  She finished in second in the 2013 World Championships in Moscow beaten by Russian teammate Elena Lashmanova.

In February 2019, Kirdyapkina was banned for three years for doping and all her results from 25 February 2011 to 11 October were disqualified including her 2 Universiade gold medals, 2 World Championship silver medals and her 2012 Olympics 5th place.

International competitions

References

External links 

1989 births
Living people
People from Saransk
Sportspeople from Mordovia
Russian female racewalkers
Olympic female racewalkers
Olympic athletes of Russia
Athletes (track and field) at the 2012 Summer Olympics
Universiade gold medalists in athletics (track and field)
Universiade gold medalists for Russia
Medalists at the 2013 Summer Universiade
Medalists at the 2015 Summer Universiade
World Athletics Championships athletes for Russia
World Athletics Championships medalists
World Athletics Race Walking Team Championships winners
European Athletics Championships medalists
Russian Athletics Championships winners
Russian sportspeople in doping cases